The 2005 Auburn Tigers football team represented Auburn University in the 2005 NCAA Division I-A football season. Despite having four starters from the 2004 team selected in the first round of 2005 NFL Draft, Auburn finished the season with a 9–3 record, including a 7–1 record in the Southeastern Conference. The Tigers shared the SEC Western Division championship with LSU, but because the Bayou Bengals defeated Auburn 20–17 in overtime on October 22, the Tigers did not advance to the SEC Championship Game. Head coach Tommy Tuberville became only the third Tigers coach to lead Auburn to a fourth consecutive win over arch rival Alabama when the Tigers defeated the Crimson Tide 28–18 at Jordan–Hare Stadium on November 19. Auburn finished the season ranked #14 in both the Coaches Poll and AP Poll, with a #13 consensus ranking.

Schedule

Roster

Offensive starters

Defensive starters

Team captains

Game summaries

Georgia

References

Auburn
Auburn Tigers football seasons
Auburn Tigers football